The Bromfield School is a public school located in Harvard, Massachusetts.  Founded in 1878 by Margaret Bromfield Blanchard, the school's student population is approximately 750, in grades 6–12.  There are 57 teachers, with a student/faculty ratio of about 1 to 13.

Bromfield's academic program includes core courses in mathematics, English, social studies, and science, as well as music, world languages, physical education and fine and applied arts. Students in grades 9–12 fulfill graduation requirements in these core courses and may also take advantage of Advanced Placement courses. The school has a graduation rate of 99%, sending nearly all graduates on to four-year higher-learning institutions. In 2011, U.S. News & World Report ranked Bromfield School as 87th in the nation out of more than 26,000 high schools, awarding it a Gold Medal on the College Readiness Index. In 2015, Bromfield was ranked 20th in the nation and second in Massachusetts in STEM fields.

Athletics
The Bromfield School also has celebrated athletic teams, especially in soccer and girls cross country/track. The boys varsity soccer team was crowned Division III state champion in 1986,1987,1988,1989,1996,2005,2007,2008 and Division IV State Champion in 2017, 2018, and 2019. The Boys were undefeated in the 1986 and 2008 seasons. The boys varsity soccer team were state champions in 2017. The girls varsity soccer team was a Division III state finalist in 2007, while the girls cross country team has been ranked by Nike at one point as the 17th best team in the nation, winning the division II state championship in 2002, 2005, 2006, and 2007. The women's track and field program has had outstanding recognition at the state and national levels, winning the Div. 4 Indoor State Championship in 2001 and each of the last three years along with the All-State Championships in both 2002 and 2003, the girls indoor track team has won the Central Mass all division Championship each of the last four years and has been the All-State runner-up the past two years.  The team is known for its distance runners; graduates include Olympian Lynn Jennings, and All-American's Arianna Lambie of Stanford and Emily Jones of Georgetown. The men's track and field program has graduated All-American Nick Steele of Villanova. The Bromfield boys tennis team has had great success in recent years.  The team was Division III district champions in 2009 and Division III state finalists in 2010.

In the early summer of 2010, Bromfield-AB Rowing Team qualified a Men’s Four and a Women’s Double for the Youth National Championships in Batavia, Ohio. The Double placed 6th and the Four placed 13th. In 2013, the Bromfield-Acton-Boxborough Junior Women's 4+ crew won gold at US National rowing competition in Oak Ridge, Tennessee and qualified for the Henley Royal Regatta.

Clubs

The Bromfield School has clubs ranging from a Varsity Math Team, which competes in the Worcester County Math League (WOCOMAL), to Bromfield Cares, an organization dedicated to helping the needy and those with cancer or other diseases. Other extra-curricular activities and clubs include Academic Bowl, Life Smarts, Math Olympiad, The Federal Reserve Challenge, The Gender and Sexuality Alliance, Bromfield Environmental Club, The Bromfield Chess Club, Debate Team, Film Club, String Ensemble and Harvard Model United Nations.

The Bromfield Drama Society has also made a name for itself by reaching the state finals of the Massachusetts High School Drama Guild Festival 29 out of the last 34 years. Notable alumni include actor Keir O'Donnell, who graduated from Bromfield in 1996.

Recent news

In June 2010, Bromfield competed in the Massachusetts state championship on the WGBH TV program, High School Quiz Show, but lost to Longmeadow High School.  In 2017, during season 8, Bromfield assembled a "dream" team for High School Quiz Show.  The team led Bromfield back to the High School Quiz Show playoffs, but  lost to AMSA in the first round.

Notable alumni
 Keir O'Donnell, Class of 1996, starred in the popular comedy movie the Wedding Crashers
 Lynn Jennings, long distance runner, Olympian
 Simon Henshaw, Class of 1978, former U.S. Ambassador to Guinea

References

External links
 
 Official website

Public middle schools in Massachusetts
Public high schools in Massachusetts
Educational institutions established in 1878
Schools in Worcester County, Massachusetts
1878 establishments in Massachusetts